The ECS Journal of Solid State Science and Technology is a monthly peer-reviewed scientific journal covering solid state science and technology. The editor-in-chief is Krishnan Rajeshwar (University of Texas at Arlington). The Technical Editors are Francis D'Souza (University of North Texas), Aniruddh Jagdish Khanna (Applied Materials Inc.), Ajit Khosla (Yamagata University), Peter Mascher (McMaster University), Kailash C. Mishra (Osram Sylvania), and Fan Ren (University of Florida). The Associate Editors are Michael Adachi (Simon Fraser University), Netz Arroyo (Johns Hopkins University School of Medicine), Paul Maggard (North Carolina State University), Meng Tao (Arizona State University), and Thomas Thundat (University at Buffalo). The journal was established in 2012 and is published by The Electrochemical Society.

Abstracting an indexing 
The journal is abstracted and indexed in the Science Citation Index Expanded, Current Contents/Physical, Chemical & Earth Sciences, Current Contents/Engineering, Computing & Technology, Chemical Abstracts Service, and Scopus. According to the Journal Citation Reports, the journal has a 2020 impact factor of 2.07.

References

External links 
 

Materials science journals
Academic journals published by learned and professional societies
Publications established in 2012
Monthly journals
English-language journals
Electrochemical Society academic journals